Indigofera linifolia, the narrowleaf indigo, is a species of flowering plant in the family Fabaceae. It is very widely distributed from Sudan eastwards to the Indian Subcontinent, Southeast Asia, Malesia, New Guinea and Australia, and it has been introduced to Réunion and New Caledonia. Livestock can consume it as fodder, and in times of famine humans can grind and bake the seeds into a bread. It grows on dry slopes, grasslands, and riversides.

References

linifolia
Flora of Sudan
Flora of Eritrea
Flora of Ethiopia
Flora of Yemen
Flora of Afghanistan
Flora of the Indian subcontinent
Flora of Indo-China
Flora of South-Central China
Flora of Taiwan
Flora of Java
Flora of the Lesser Sunda Islands
Flora of the Maluku Islands
Flora of the Philippines
Flora of New Guinea
Flora of Australia
Plants described in 1786